Aces Go Places, known as Mad Mission in the United States, is a series of Hong Kong action comedy films that are parodies of the James Bond film series.

The films star Sam Hui as King Kong, a master thief and martial arts expert who is aided by his bumbling sidekick, Detective Albert "Baldy" Au, portrayed by Karl Maka.

The series began in 1982, with the first two films directed by Eric Tsang. Subsequent films were directed by Tsui Hark, Ringo Lam and Lau Kar-leung respectively.

Lucky Stars Go Places, a crossover with the Lucky Stars film series, was released in 1986.

A sixth film, 97 Aces Go Places was made in 1997 with a different cast.

Titles in the series
Aces Go Places (Mad Mission 1, 1982)
Aces Go Places 2 (Mad Mission 2: Aces Go Places, 1983)
Aces Go Places 3 (Mad Mission 3: Our Man From Bond Street, 1984)
Aces Go Places IV (Mad Mission 4: You Never Die Twice, 1986)
Aces Go Places 5: The Terracotta Hit (Mad Mission 5, 1989)
97 Aces Go Places (1997)

Cast and characters

References

Cantonese-language films
Action film series
Comedy film series
Hong Kong action comedy films
1980s parody films
1980s action comedy films
Parody films based on James Bond films
Hong Kong detective films
1980s Hong Kong films